The Sheriff of Renfrew and Argyll was historically the royal official responsible for enforcing law and order and bringing criminals to justice in Renfrew and Argyll, Scotland.

Prior to 1748 most sheriffdoms were held on a hereditary basis. From that date, following the Jacobite uprising of 1745, the hereditary sheriffs were replaced by salaried sheriff-deputes, qualified advocates who were members of the Scottish Bar.

The sheriffdom of Renfrew was combined with the sheriffdom of Bute in 1871, creating the new position of Sheriff of Bute and Renfrew It was merged in 1946 with the sheriffdom of Argyll instead, creating the position of Sheriff of Renfrew and Argyll. That sheriffdom was in turn dissolved in 1975 to be replaced by the current sheriffdom of North Strathclyde.

Sheriffs of Renfrew

 Sir William Semple, 1471– 
 Thomas Sempill (killed 1488) 
 John Sempill, 1st Lord Sempill (1489) (killed 1513) 
 William Sempill, 2nd Lord Sempill (1515) (died 1552) 
 Robert Sempill, 3rd Lord Sempill (died 1576) 
 John Sempill, 1st of Beltrees (died 1579) 
 James Sempill, 2nd of Beltrees (died 1626)
 Alexander, Earl of Eglinton, 1636- (died 1661) 
 Francis Sempill
 Earls of Eglinton, –1748

Sheriffs-Depute
 Charles Macdonald of Crichen, 1748- 
 Charles McDowall, c.1786 
 Allan Maconochie, Lord Meadowbank of Kirknewton, 1788–1796 
 John Connel, 1796–c.1814 
 John Colin Dunlop, 1816–1842 
 Hercules Robertson, 1842–1853
 Robert MacFarlane, 1853–1862 
 Patrick Fraser, 1864–1871

Sheriffs of Renfrew and Bute (1871)
Henry James Moncrieff, 1881-1888 
Sir Charles Pearson, 1888–1889 (Sheriff of Perth, 1889–90)
Sir John Cheyne, 1889–1907
Neil John Downie Kennedy, 1907–1912
John Wilson, 1912–1917
Alastair Oswald Morison Mackenzie, January–July 1917 (Sheriff of Lanark, 1917)
David Anderson, 1917–1918
Charles Murray, 1918–1918
James Mercer Irvine, 1918–1945

Sheriffs of Renfrew and Argyll (1946)
 Thomas Murray-Taylor, 1946–1948 
 James Randall Philip, QC, 1948–1955  {Sheriff of Perth and Angus, 1955}
 William Ross McLean, QC, 1955–1960  (Sheriff of the Lothians and Peebles, 1960)
 Ian Shearer, Lord Avonside, QC, 1960–1962 
 Alexander Thomson, 1962–1964
 William Robertson Grieve, Lord Grieve, QC, 1964–1972  
 James Mackay, 1972–1974
 The sheriffdom was abolished in 1975 and replaced by the current Sheriffdom of North Strathclyde.

See also
 Historical development of Scottish sheriffdoms

References

sheriff
sheriff